Vida robada (English title: Stolen life) is a Mexican telenovela produced by Carlos Sotomayor for Televisa in 1991. It is a remake of 1974 Mexican telenovela Ha llegado una intrusa.

Erika Buenfil and Sergio Goyri starred as protagonists, while Cynthia Klitbo and Rosa María Bianchi starred as antagonists.

Plot
Gabriela is a good and generous young woman studying at a university, without knowing who pays for her education since she has no family. After a series of circumstances, she decides to replace a classmate Leticia, a rich and vicious girl who after escaping never returned home.

Cast 

 Erika Buenfil as Gabriela Durán Carrasco/Leticia Avelar
 Sergio Goyri as Carlos Medina
 Cynthia Klitbo as Leticia Avelar/Verónica Almeida  (antagonist)
 Fernando Luján as Don Ramón Avelar
 Rosa María Bianchi as Irene Avelar (antagonist)
 Sonia Furió as Carlota Carvajal
 Fernando Sáenz as Gabino
 Queta Carrasco as Juventina
 Romina Castro as Anaísa
 Juan Carlos Colombo as Ernesto Lascuráin"
 Joaquín Garrido as Cuco Constantino Costas as Tony Hansen José Antonio Ferral as Pancho Raúl Magaña as Luis Silvia Mariscal as Daniela Guy de Saint Cyr as Guillermo Alvarado Jacqueline Munguía as Rosita Aída Naredo as Corina Juan Felipe Preciado as Anselmo Medina Martha Resnikoff as 'Lupe
 Luis Rivera as Rubén Carvajal
 Sergio Sánchez as Felipe
 Yadira Santana as Nelly Carvajal
 Jorge Urzúa as Jorge
 Lucy Tame as Claudia
 Dacia Arcaráz as Leonor Carvajal
 Benjamín Islas as Inspector
 Brenda Oliver
 Fabiola Campomanes
 Dinorah Cavazos
 Eva Díaz
 Israel Jaitovich
 Luis Ángel Nerey
 José Antonio Sánchez
 Fernando Rivera
 Estela Ruiz

References

External links

1991 telenovelas
Mexican telenovelas
1991 Mexican television series debuts
1992 Mexican television series endings
Spanish-language telenovelas
Television shows set in Mexico
Televisa telenovelas